Igor Lyovshin (born 18 August 1974) is a former Russian handball player for the Russian national team. Currently he is a goalkeeping coach at CSKA Moscow.

References

1974 births
Living people
Russian male handball players
People from Tiraspol